Candlewood may refer to:

Candlewood Lake, the largest lake in Connecticut
Pterocelastrus tricuspidatus, a medium-sized evergreen tree, indigenous to South Africa.
Candlewood, New Jersey, an unincorporated community in the United States.
Candlewood Town Park, a public park in Danbury, Connecticut